Lumen Eclipse is a public media arts gallery located in Harvard Square, Cambridge, Massachusetts, founded to expand public awareness of local, national, and international artists. The gallery is situated on two mounted displays on the Tourism Information Kiosk, just outside the Harvard Square MBTA stop, screening motion art daily. The gallery may also be viewed on the Lumen Eclipse website.

History 
Lumen Eclipse presents contemporary motion art in public spaces, using outdoor video displays, social venues, and the web. The gallery launched November 1, 2005, in Harvard Square. Lumen Eclipse exhibits 8 works a month, representing over 300 artists since launching in 2005. Participating artists have included: Yoko Ono, Michel Gondry, Miranda July, Max Hattler and Isaac Julien.

Lumen Eclipse also hosts intimate monthly screenings to facilitate dialog between artists and audiences. The Screenings are called "Le Peek" and are held at local social venues in Cambridge MA.

Facts 
 In Fall 2005, curator Ryan Hovenweep asked Turbulence.org's Helen Thorington and Jo-Anne Green to recommend works for his December 2005/January 2006 exhibitions. Two Turbulence Artists' Studio works - "Tenderly Yours" by Peter Horvath, and "re_collection" by Michael Takeo Magruder - were included in the December exhibition, which was reviewed by Cate McQuaid for the Boston Globe. A Turbulence.org Commission, "Tap Evol" by Victor Liu, was shown in the January 2006 exhibition. These were the first instances of net art shown as video art in Cambridge, Massachusetts.
 Manhattan's New Museum of Contemporary Art acted as the gallery's first guest curator in February 2006.
 The gallery commissions original work on the theme of life in Cambridge, Massachusetts.
 In June 2006, the gallery's first interactive exhibit – by Massachusetts Institute of Technology’s Nell Breyer – went on display.
 Lumen Eclipse hosts Le:60 their annual 1-minute film festival on Palmer Street in Harvard Square. Le:60

Works 
 57 Things to do for Free in Harvard Square is a compilation/archive of 57 videos that provide humorous yet simple things one can do for fun in Harvard Square. These "things to do" are both simple and silly and could likely be done in any urban environment. The site has a matrix structure, where any point of the site can be accessed from any other point; this form of organization allows the user to jump to any one of the 57 videos from any place on the site at any time.

Exhibited artists of note 
 DJ Spooky
 Miranda July
 Yoko Ono
 Tore Terrasi
 Mike Mills
 Michel Gondry
 Hexstatic
 Isaac Julien
 William Kentridge
 Janet Biggs
 Aleksandra Domanovic
 Max Hattler
 Martha Colburn
 Takeshi Murata
 Encyclopedia Pictura

External links 
 Lumen Eclipse at Harvard Square
 Le:60 - Lumen Eclipse's 1-Minute Film Festival
 Le Peek - Lumen Eclipse's Monthly Screenings
 57 Things to do for Free in Harvard Square
 One to watch in Harvard Square, Cate McQuaid, The Boston Globe, December 16, 2005

Images 
 Lumen Eclipse on Flickr
 Lumen Eclipse Video Display

Harvard Square
Art museums and galleries in Massachusetts
Tourist attractions in Middlesex County, Massachusetts
Art galleries established in 2005
2005 establishments in Massachusetts